Nebria picta is a species of beetle from family Carabidae that is endemic to Tajikistan.

References

picta
Beetles described in 1891
Beetles of Asia
Endemic fauna of Tajikistan